Lipservice is the seventh studio album by the hard rock band Gotthard. It was released in 2005 on Nuclear Blast. The album reached No. 1 on the Swiss charts, and was certified as Platinum for exceeding 30,000 sales.

Track listing

Personnel
Steve Lee: lead vocals
Leo Leoni: guitars and backing vocals
Marc Lynn: bass
Hena Habegger: drums and percussion
Freddy Scherer: guitars

Charts

Weekly charts

Year-end charts

References

External links
Heavy Harmonies page

2005 albums
Gotthard (band) albums
Nuclear Blast albums